The Palace of the Republic is a palatial government building in Minsk, Belarus. It is used for official state functions including forums, meetings, conventions, multi-genre concerts, symphony orchestras, and New Year's events.

Background
According to its official website, the idea for this building was conceptualised by Pyotr Masherov, first secretary of the central committee of the Communist Party of Belarus. In 1982, a competition was conducted to produce a design for the building. Belgosproject produced the winning design. Construction began in 1985 but came to a halt as a result of the political upheaval caused by the fall of the Soviet Union. 

Construction restarted in 1995 by the order of Alexander Lukashenko, the first elected president of the newly formed Republic of Belarus. Building work was completed in October 1997 and the palace became fully operational on the last day of 2001 and features a 2,700-seat auditorium, a 500-seat indoor amphitheater, a press center, and several conference halls.

Gallery

References

External links 
 Official website 

Buildings and structures in Minsk
Government of Belarus